This is an overview of the results of New Zealand at the UCI Road World Championships.

List of medalists

New Zealand medals 
Sources:

This a list of New Zealand medals won at the UCI Road World Championships.

Other New Zealand medalists
Since the 2012 UCI Road World Championships there is the men's and women's team time trial event for trade teams and these medals are included under the UCI registration country of the team. Here are listed of the medalists who won a medal with a non-New Zealand based team.

Medal table

Medals by year

Medals by discipline
updated after the 2021 UCI Road World Championships

Position per event
The table below has the highest placed rider for each event during each year.

Note: As of 2022 there has not been a New Zealand-based team for any Team Time-trial events.

Notes

References

See also

Nations at the UCI Road World Championships
New Zealand at cycling events